The 2014 Guangzhou Evergrande season is the 61st year in Guangzhou Evergrande's existence and is its 47th season in the Chinese football league, also its 25th season in the top flight.

Players

First team squad

Reserve squad

Technical staff

Last updated: August 2014
Source: Guangzhou Evergrande F.C.

Transfers

In

Winter

Summer

Out

Winter

Summer

Loan out

Pre-season and friendlies

Training matches

2014 Marbella Cup

Atlético Mineiro China Tour

China-Germany International Football Challenge

Competitions

Overview

Competition record

Chinese Super League

League table

Results summary

Results by round

Matches

Chinese FA Cup

Chinese FA Super Cup

AFC Champions League

Group stage

Knockout stage

Round of 16

Quarter-finals

Statistics

Appearances and goals

Goalscorers

Assists

Clean sheets

Disciplinary record

Overview

Notes and references

Guangzhou F.C.
Guangzhou F.C. seasons